Sleep is a naturally recurring state of mind and body, characterized by altered consciousness, relatively inhibited sensory activity, reduced muscle activity, and inhibition of nearly all voluntary muscles during rapid eye movement (REM) sleep, and reduced interactions with surroundings. An essential aspect of sleep is that it provides the human body with a period of reduced functioning that allows for the systems throughout the body to be repaired. This time allows for the body to recharge and return to a phase of optimal functioning. It is recommended that adults get 7 to 9 hours of sleep each night. Sleep is regulated by an internal process known as the circadian rhythm. This 24-hour cycle regulates periods of alertness and tiredness that an individual experiences. The correlation between psychological stress and sleep is complex and not fully understood.  In fact, many studies have found a bidirectional relationship between stress and sleep. This means that sleep quality can affect stress levels, and stress levels can affect sleep quality. Sleep change depends on the type of stressor, sleep perception, related psychiatric conditions, environmental factors, and physiological limits.

Stress/Sleep Cycle 
It is critical that we receive an adequate amount of sleep each night. According to the Centers for Disease Control and Prevention, people 18-60 years old need 7 or more hours of sleep per night.  The majority of college students fall in this age range. While sleep is critical, it is no big surprise that many college students aren’t reaching this threshold amount of sleep, and are subsequently facing detrimental effects. Yet, after analyzing the research it is clear that stress and sleep in college students are interrelated, instead of one only affecting the other. “Stress and sleep affect each other. Poor sleep can increase stress, otherwise high-stress can also cause sleep disturbances”. As stated in a different way, the way stress and sleep are related is bidirectional in nature.

Types of stressors 
Stressors can be categorized into the Challenge/Hindrance stressor model. Challenge stressors, while unpleasant, allow for growth and achievement such as time pressure in a work context. Hindrance stressors are those that cause unnecessary burdens and do not contribute to achievement such as poor work supervision. Self-reported quality of sleep reduces in relation to more hindrance stressors but not to challenge stressors.

Sleep quality perception 
Insomnia is a common condition affecting up to a fifth of the population in many countries across the world and is often complicated by several psychiatric conditions. Paradoxical insomnia is the phenomenon of a discrepancy between reported sleep duration and objective measurement of sleep. In some cases, however, the stress and anxiety produced do result in an objective reduction in the quality of sleep.

Factors of Stress that Lead to a Lack of Sleep
The factors of stress that contribute to the lack of sleep include, but are not limited to, overthinking, excess caffeine consumption, and excess cortisol emission. Overthinking is a very common factor in keeping people awake because they are unable to calm their minds from their stressors. This rumination can impact the transitions between sleep stages since going to bed while overthinking can lead to disruptions in the stages in the middle of the night. Another cycle that also occurs with stress is that people under more stress tend to consume larger amounts of caffeine which can actually increase stress/anxiety levels. Furthermore, if people drink too much caffeine later in the day, they may have trouble falling asleep which will cause them to sleep fewer hours and have to continue the cycle of drinking more caffeine the next day to feel awake throughout the day. It is known that sleep deprivation can affect the efficiency at which one performs, such as at work for example. What is one way to counter this? More coffee. The cycle repeats itself. Cortisol, the stress hormone that is responsible for the fight-or-flight response, increases during times of stress and can often lead to a feeling of a jolt of energy. If people are feeling highly stressed right before bed, they may release higher amounts of cortisol which can cause unhealthy levels of sleep. It is also important to recognize that the stress one feels does not need to be chronic or trauma-induced. Everyday stressors in work, relationships, and other parts of life can impact a person’s sleep cycle and continuous days of feeling stressed or overwhelmed can lead to multiple restless nights. The effects of stress on one’s sleep quantity and quality can become frustrating, unhealthy, and harmful to a person’s quality of life.

Increased Prevalence of Stress for Teenagers
There are consistent stressors in life, some that are good, referred to as eustress, and some that are bad, which are referred to as distress. While these stressors have not necessarily increased over the years, the overall average stress levels have increased as data has shown that the typical high school student today has the same amount of anxiety as a psychiatric patient in the 1950s. The average stress level in the United States -- 5.6 out of 10 -- is far above past average levels and is the highest it has been in the last decade. There is also evidence showing that age impacts the correlation between lack of sleep and stress. Millennials (born between 1981 and 1996) and Gen Zers (born between 1997 and 2012) report the highest levels of stress out of all the generations, in which 44% of millennials and 48% of Gen Zers report being stressed all or most of the time. Correspondingly, younger Americans report getting fewer hours of sleep per night, in which a large portion only sleeps for about 6.5-7.5 hours per night on average. These correlating statistics reveal an epidemic that is being created with stress and an increased risk of chronic sleep deprivation. Stress often leads to difficulties falling asleep and staying asleep, however, a lack of sleep can also contribute to one’s stress levels. This relationship leads to a never-ending cycle of being too stressed to sleep and then being unable to control one’s anxieties because of the impacts of a lack of sleep. Unfortunately, this troubling cycle also causes an increased risk for the potential impacts of sleep deprivation and excessive stress, including many physical and mental health issues. These issues can have long-term consequences that may affect one’s social life, academic capabilities, and relationships with others.

Neuropsychiatric mechanisms 
Sleep can be broadly split into the lighter "rapid eye movement" (REM) and deeper "non-rapid eye movement" (NREM). Changes in sleep phase vary in animal models depending on the stressor but do not alter total sleep duration except for novelty which reduces both REM and NREM. Conditioned fear, for example, reduces REM sleep whereas auditory stimulation increases it. 

In humans, models of stress have been closely linked to the context depression. Changes in sleep patterns in depression are very close to those seen in acutely stressed animals; these changes can be used as a predictor for developing depression. Once again, studies have shown a bidirectional nature between depressive symptoms and lack of sleep due to stress. Long-term/chronic psychosocial stress is known to cause depression symptoms but the effect of chronic stress on sleep can lead to a ripple effect of further damage including poor emotional stability, lowered attention span and self-control, and worse performance on cognitive tasks. Early life sleep disruption caused by stressors may affect neuroplasticity and synaptic connectivity potentially leading to the development of mood disorders. This poor sleep may become a stressor itself compounding the phenomenon.

Cholinergic neurons 
In animal studies, psychologically stressed rats display an increase in total REM sleep and the average length of REM phase duration (but not the number of cycles). This change is mediated by cholinergic neurons as stressed animals' prolonged REM cycles can be reduced by using a cholinergic antagonist (atropine). One study found that auditory stimulation stressors act similarly by inhibiting the cholinergic reduction of REM sleep. Chronic mildly stressed rats display a reduction in inhibitory GABA receptors in the hypothalamus (increasing the release of stress hormones) and brain stem among others. Within the pedunculopontine tegmentum region, in the brainstem, reduced GABA imbibition of cholinergic neurons acts again in the same way in increasing REM sleep duration.

Hypothalamic-pituitary-adrenal axis 
The neuroendocrine hypothalamic-pituitary-adrenal axis is a system of hormones that culminates in the release of cortisol from the adrenal glands in response to acute stress and is also seen to regulate sleep patterns. The reduction in GABA receptors in the hypothalamus seen in chronic stress reduces the inhibition of stress hormone release however does not appear to impact sleep patterns after exposure to a stressful social stimulus in animals.

Prenatal and childhood stress 
Chronic maternal stress in pregnancy exposes the fetus to increased levels of glucocorticoid and inflammatory markers which in turn negatively affects the H-P-A axis and disrupts sleep regulation of the fetus. Up until the age of 2 years, children who have been exposed to prenatal stress have shortened and disorganized sleeping patterns. During early childhood development, the child's brain is particularly sensitive to adverse events such as family conflict, maternal postnatal depression, or abuse. It is thought that it is via sensitization of the H-P-A axis that an abnormal stress response is developed in response to these events/stressors which in turn causes emotional disorders and later life sleeping disorders.

Stress & substance abuse 
Chronic stress leads to the malfunction of the HPA axis which can lead to sudden relapse in previously well-recovering alcoholics. Changes in HPA axis regulation lead to drastic over/underproduction of important stress response hormones because the system is usually kept under very tight regulation in order to quickly respond to external stimuli. Cortisol, the main stress hormone produced by the HPA axis is thought to be responsible for the vulnerability to alcohol abuse. Studies show that cortisol production correlates with heightened activity in the neural reward pathways of the brain, which could explain how stress leads to alcoholism.

Immune mediation 
Observations have been made that there is an association between stress, sleep, and Interleukin-6 proposing a possible mechanism for sleep changes.

During both chronic and acute phase sleep deprivation, there are increases in the pro-inflammatory cytokine Interleukin-6 (IL-6). Not only is IL-6 influenced by the circadian rhythm but its effectiveness is increased by sleep itself as there is an increase in serum IL-6 receptors during sleep. After periods of long sleep deprivation, the first post-deprivation sleep shows a marked drop in IL-6 and an increase in slow wave sleep / "deep sleep". Similarly napping during the daytime has been shown to decrease IL-6 and reduce tiredness. When humans are injected with exogenous IL-6 they display an increase in fatigue and other sickness behaviour.

This IL-6 increase is also observed during times of increased psychological stress. In a laboratory setting, individuals exposed to psychological stressors have had raised IL-6 (an acute-phase protein CRP) measured especially in those who displayed anger or anxiety in response to the stressful stimulus. Just as the human body responds to inflammation-inducing illness with increased fatigue or reduced sleep quality, so too does it respond to psychological stress with a sickness behavior of tiredness and poor sleep quality. While sleep is important for recovery from stress, as, with an inflammatory illness, continuous and long-term increases of inflammatory markers with its associated behaviors may be considered maladaptive and be linked to long-term inefficient sleep.

Military context 
Since the American Civil War, there have been multiple "war syndromes" reported such as 'irritable heart', 'effort syndrome' and 'Gulf War Syndrome'. Thought to be discrete and different from post-traumatic stress disorder (PTSD), these war syndromes have a range of physical symptoms but commonly feature sleep disturbances, tiredness, poor concentration, and nightmares. The historic picture is unclear due to poor contemporary understanding of psychological illness and, in more modern conflicts, gathering data has been difficult due to operational priorities; no cause has been identified that isn't connected to psychological stress.

PTSD 
Sleep is often a core focus for both diagnosis and management of PTSD with 70% of PTSD patients reporting insomnia or sleep disturbances. When studied against controls, however, little difference was measured in the quality of sleep suggesting paradoxical insomnia along with physiological H-P-A axis involvement and "fight or flight responses". It is on this basis that CBT, a non-pharmacological therapy, is justified along with pharmacological intervention.

One month after the coronavirus outbreak, a study determined a frequency of PTSD (Post-traumatic stress disorder) symptoms among inhabitants of Wuhan and its surrounding villages. To better understand this phenomenon, a study was conducted in Canada after a two-month state of emergency was declared (2020). Many subjects began to have dreams highlighting deep-rooted trauma, like early childhood experiences, however not one subject described the pandemic as traumatic, simply stressful. The dream content was especially interesting because it had little to no relation to the pandemic; this study was consistent with others questioning the reemergence of PTSD when faced with a new stressor.

Stress and trauma can lead to vivid dreams. The classic “PTSD dream” can be used as a lens to understand the effect of waking stress on one’s sleep. A PTSD dream occurs often and is a replay of a traumatic event. The person is woken up in sweats, shaking; fear, anxiety, anger, etc. are all induced.

Occupational Context 
One of the greatest factors affecting the stress and sleep of humans is their commitment to their jobs. In our society, one's employment schedule often dictates their sleep schedule. The bidirectional relationship between stress and sleep is also scientifically supported in terms of employment. When an employee does not get quality sleep, this often leads to poor performance at work and a greater chance of experiencing stress related to work. Similarly, when a person is experiencing occupational stress, their sleep is almost immediately negatively influenced. When individuals experience high levels of stress and insufficient amounts of sleep their mental and physical health is jeopardized.

Development of Occupational Stress
Many factors contribute to the development of occupational stress in one's life. Some of these factors include job scheduling, time commitment, lack of support, and conflicts within the workplace. Depending on the field in which people are employed, the demands of the job vary greatly. Some occupations demand at least 40 hours a week from an employee. This commitment, combined with other personal responsibilities, often leaves individuals little time for themselves, which elevates stress levels. When individuals have irregular work schedules, such as working at different times from week to week their regular day-to-day schedule is interrupted. This not only adds stress to their daily life but also influences an individual's circadian rhythm. The circadian rhythm is especially interrupted when individuals work night shifts. When faced with this challenge the body is not only stressed but must also adapt to new environmental factors. For instance, this would require the body to be more alert during late night hours as opposed to entering a relaxed state, as the average circadian rhythm would support. 

Another main contributor to the development of occupational stress in employees is a feeling of a lack of support and recognition from superiors. When employees are not supported by their superiors, employees are more likely to experience stress related to their work responsibilities. Often employees dedicate extra time to perfect their work to achieve the desired validation they seek from superiors.  When employees are not recognized and supported by their superiors, feelings of uncertainty begin to grow and overwhelm the individual. Additionally, when the responsibilities and expectations of an employee are not clearly understood this often leaves the employee questioning their place in the work environment.  

Finally, conflicts within the workplace have been named as a major stressor when it comes to employment. When conflicts arise in the workplace the unsafe environment raises the employee's stress level and often produces an extreme emotional response. Furthermore, these anxiety-inducing conflicts lead employees to dread coming to work each day. These matters distract individuals and influence their overall productivity. It is important to note that these conflicts often revolve around a difference in power between the parties involved. Instances of sexual harassment within the work environment are the most prevalent and cause unnecessary amounts of stress.

Risk Factors and Interventions 
Combining high levels of stress and a lack of sleep affects the day-to-day life of humans. For example, work performance often suffers under these conditions. Individuals suffering from stress and sleep deprivation also tend to have higher levels of absenteeism and take a greater number of sick days compared to their peers. When adequate amounts of sleep are not obtained, individuals are at a greater risk for developing heart disease, diabetes, hypertension, muscle pain, headaches, and a series of mental health problems. There is a strong association between lack of sleep and increased irritability, depression, and anxiety disorders. The working memory of individuals experiencing sleep deprivation is also affected.

There are various methods and practices that individuals can engage in to lower their levels of stress and optimize their sleep. Employers should address possible stressors within the work environment. Employers need to monitor the workloads and schedules of their employees to minimize burnout, but more importantly to prioritize the health of their workers. Providing training and clearly stating the expectations of an employee will help employees to better understand their role in the workplace. By building a positive work environment, employees will feel supported by their superiors and experience less stress in their daily life. An essential first step for employees is to acknowledge the stressor in their life. On an individual basis, employees experiencing high levels of stress and restlessness can engage in cognitive-behavioral interventions to manage their stress. Practicing simple self-care routines and setting aside time for the things that one enjoys will aid in minimizing the levels of stress that employees experience.

Performance and Attention Context
While stress and sleep greatly impact each other, their effect permeates into many more aspects of daily life. One specific concern is the harmful effects on cognitive performance and attention span. In addition, sleep deprivation can cause a change in perceptions as well. Being sleep-deprived for 24 hours leads to a dramatic decrease in cognitive performance tests similar to college exams, and causes individuals to have false perceptions about their performance. Hence, sleep-deprived individuals are cognitively performing worse but are not aware of it. In addition to cognitive performance, sleep deprivation can cause a decreased attention span on specific tasks at hand. This has further implications such as making more mistakes or not being as efficient. It can become a cycle of high stress, poor sleep, and lack of attention when these three things are intermixed.

Short-Term Physical Health Impacts of Stress & Sleep Deprivation
Both excessive stress and sleep deprivation cause physical health impacts that may affect a person short-term or long-term. These impacts range in severity and it is important to be aware of the increased risk of health issues that may arise due to the stress-sleep cycle. Many of the physical impacts of stress overlap with the physical impacts of sleep deprivation, including short-term impacts like fatigue and headaches, and long-term impacts like high blood pressure, heart disease, diabetes, and obesity. Fatigue is a clear side effect of sleep deprivation, however, when combined with excessive stress, the feeling of fatigue can become overwhelming because one’s body is having to work harder and is under more pressure which causes a person to feel further fatigued. Headaches are another short-term impact that occurs often for those who are feeling excessive levels of stress since stress often triggers a fight or flight response which can create tension headaches. A lack of sleep also causes increases in the creation of proteins in the body that cause chronic pain by reducing the body’s threshold for experiencing pain which leads to more painful headaches. In both cases, the headaches can be chronic, and they often feel more tension-based. When lack of sleep and excessive stress combine, the impacts of fatigue and headaches greatly increase. Although these impacts are both short-term, they can last for days, weeks, or even months if the stress continues to overwhelm a person and cause them to struggle to fall and stay asleep.

Long-Term Physical Health Impacts of Stress & Sleep Deprivation

Cardiovascular Impacts
Long-term effects can result from years of persistent feelings of excessive levels of stress and consequently getting a consistent lack of sleep. Excessive stress and sleep deprivation can cause cardiovascular issues, such as high blood pressure and heart disease. In a study focusing on the impacts of chronic stress on the heart, it was found that during times of chronic stress, the body hyperactivates the sympathetic nervous system which leads to changes in heart rate variability. Due to these changes in heart rate variability, which can harm the capabilities and strength of the heart, the risk of heart disease greatly increases due to elevated blood sugar and blood pressure levels. Prolongation of this stress on the body can cause plaque buildup in the artery walls which impedes blood flow and results in a much higher likelihood of major cardiovascular events, including heart attack and stroke. Sleep also adds to these cardiovascular impacts because blood pressure normally decreases during sleep. As a result, someone with a consistent lack of sleep has higher blood pressure levels for longer periods of time. In a study that was conducted to find the correlation between sleep deprivation and cardiovascular issues, it was found that one hour less of sleep each night increased the risk of calcium build-up in the arteries by 33%. Calcium buildup in the arteries is a major cause of plaque buildup, which was also mentioned as highly affected by increased stress levels. When combined, excessive stress and sleep deprivation cause a much larger increase in plaque buildup which can lead to an increased risk of heart disease, stroke, and high blood pressure. When someone is constantly feeling stressed throughout their day and then struggles to fall and stay asleep due to stress and anxiety, it creates a continued cycle of strain on the heart.

Increased Chance of Diabetes
Another long-term effect of excessive stress and minimal sleep is an increased risk of diabetes. Stress hormones in one’s body directly affect glucose levels since the fight-or-flight response causes increased hormone levels as one’s nerve cells become activated. The body’s release of adrenaline and cortisol into the bloodstream causes an inability to process the glucose released by the nerve cells which leads to a buildup in the bloodstream. There are also many consequences of sleep deprivation that increase the risk of diabetes. When the body is going through heavy sleep loss, it can form insulin resistance which is a precursor to diabetes. Insulin resistance occurs when cells fail to use insulin efficiently which results in high blood sugar. Furthermore, when people lack sleep, it affects their diet because it increases one’s hunger and appetite. This makes overeating more likely and people tend to consume foods and drinks high in sugars and carbohydrates. This increased consumption of foods, especially those with unhealthy sugar and carbohydrate levels, leads to possible weight gain and further increases in blood sugar which can increase the likelihood of diabetes. These negative effects from both sleep deprivation and excessive stress, which causes issues with insulin levels and glucose levels, can combine to have a larger impact on the chances of getting diabetes or becoming pre-diabetic.

Increased Chance of Obesity
Finally, another long-term effect that creates a combined risk is the effect of excessive stress and sleep deprivation on obesity. While short-term stress may cause people to lose their appetite, chronic stress causes the release of cortisol which increases a person’s appetite. Many effects from stress cause people to overeat, including a lack of self-regulation during stressful times, a want for “comfort food” which is often high in sugar, fat, and calories, and cortisol’s promotion of eating and fat deposition. These all cause stressful times to have many physiological and behavioral impacts on one’s diet. Furthermore, sleep deprivation has been shown to decrease glucose tolerance and insulin sensitivity, and increase hunger and appetite, all of which impact one’s diet and what foods they prefer. These hormonal changes often cause an increase in caloric intake and decrease the energy for many physical activities which combine to increase the likelihood of obesity. The many impacts of increasing stress levels and sleep deprivation show that there are many factors that can cause overall weight gain which may lead to obesity. It is important to note that many of these effects are more impactful after long-term chronic stress and sleep deprivation, however, since sleep deprivation and stress often coincide, it leads to a much greater chance of developing these harmful physical health impacts. Since both sleep deprivation and stress have similar impacts on one’s body, the overall likelihood of serious health issues increases.

References 

Sleep
Psychological stress